Social Esportiva Vitória (also known as SEV Hortolândia or SEV) was a Brazilian football located in the city of Hortolândia, São Paulo. The club was founded on 10 May 2001 as "Sociedade Esportiva Votuporanga" in the city of Votuporanga, where the club remained until 2005. The club commenced activities at their new location in January 2006. SEV Hortolândia play their matches at the Estádio Municipal José Francisco Breda, which has a capacity of 10,002 spectators.

History

Founding 
On 10 May 2001, Sociedade Esportiva Votuporanga was founded by in the city of Votuporanga. In 2002 the club competed in the now-defunct Campeonato Paulista Serie B3 (the sixth division of São Paulo football). Two consecutive promotions in 2003 and 2004 qualified Sociedade Esportiva Votuporanga for the 2005 Serie A3.

Relocation 
After a bad 2005 campaign, the club relocated to Hortolândia in search of better municipal support and business sponsorship, and the club was renamed to Social Esportiva Vitória. Closer location to the state capital increased the club's chance of success.

As early as 2006, the team competed under the new name of SEV Hortolândia. The team began activities in the new headquarters on 29 January 2006, competing in the Paulista Championship Series A3. Their first match in Hortolândia was on 19 March in the Estadio José Francisco Breda Municipal. The match ended in a 2-0 defeat to Ferroviária.

In 2007 the under-20 team of SEV Hortolandia participated in and won the Trinidad and Tobago international tournament. In 2008, the SEV youth team participated for the first time in a national competition, the São Paulo Junior Football Cup.

Withdrawal from professional competition 
In 2011, lacking resources and support from the city, SEV did not apply for the professional license to compete in the São Paulo state league.

After two years of absence, the team returns in 2013 to the participate in the fourth division of the São Paulo championship. In 2015, the club announced permanent retirement from the championship, competing in youth competitions only.

Competition history 
São Paulo State Championship

Copa São Paulo de Futebol Júnior

References 

Inactive football clubs in Brazil
Football clubs in São Paulo